Locho is steamed Gujarati Farsan (Snack /Side Dish) originated in Surat. It is made from Gram Flour. The dish derives its name from its loose consistency and irregular shape like dumplings. It is somewhat related to Khaman. Unlike Khaman it is not served in regular shaped cut pieces. It is often seasoned with oil, butter, Sev, spices, coriander, onion etc.

Locho is widely eaten in Surat city. This farsan is popular as Surti Locho. It is also very popular in Navsari and other regions in South Gujarat.

References

Gujarati cuisine
Indian snack foods